František Xaver Brixi (2 January 1732 – 14 October 1771) was a Czech classical composer of the 18th century. His first name is sometimes given by reference works in its Germanic form, Franz.

Biography
Brixi was born in Prague, the son of composer Šimon Brixi. He received his musical education at the Piarist Gymnasium in Kosmonosy. His teachers included , a significant composer himself.

In 1749 Brixi left Kosmonosy and returned to Prague, where he worked as an organist at several churches. In 1759 he was appointed Regens chori (choir director) and Kapellmeister of St Vitus Cathedral, thus attaining, at age 27, the highest musical position in the city; this office he held till his early death. He wrote some 290 church works (of the most varied type), cantatas and oratorios, chamber compositions, and orchestral compositions. He was a prolific composer of music for the liturgy, and wrote more than 100 masses, vespers and motets, among others. He also composed secular music such as oratorios and incidental music, concertos and symphonies. His organ concertos, which have been recorded several times each, are his best-known pieces today.

Brixi died of tuberculosis in Prague in 1771, at the age of 39.

Style
Brixi was an important composer at the junction between Baroque and the Classical period.
Brixi's style is distinguished from that of his contemporaries by its fresh melodic writing, vivacious rhythm and lively bass lines, and from that of his predecessors by its simple yet effective instrumentation. During his lifetime his music was widely disseminated in Bohemia and Moravia.

Influence

Brixi's music made Prague's people receptive for Mozart's music (where Mozart was in high esteem even during times where he was shunned elsewhere).

Compositions
Brixi composed 500 works, in which sacred music dominated. None of his compositions were published during Brixi's lifetime.

Source:

 Missa di Gloria in D major (c.1758)
 Missa integra in D minor
 Missa brevis in C major for soloists, choir orchestra and organ
 Missa aulica in C major
 Missa pastoralis in C major
 Missa pastoralis in D major
 Missa solemnis in D major for soloists, choir, orchestra and organ
 Missa Dominicalis in C major
 8 Organ Concertos
 Viola Concerto in C major
 Sinfonia in D major
 Oratorio Opus patheticum de septem doloribus Beatae Mariae Virginis
 Oratorio Crux morientis Jesu Christi
 Oratorio Filius Prodigus (Osek 1755)
 Oratorio Judas Iscariothes – Oratorium pro die sacro Parasceves (Osek c.1770)
 Litanie de seto Benedieto
 Confiteor tibi Domine
 Bitevní sinfonie
 Fuga in A minor
 Pastoral in C major
 Preludium In C major
 Regina coeli

Notes

References

Further reading

External links
 František Brixi 
 
 IMSLP

1732 births
1771 deaths
18th-century Bohemian musicians
18th-century classical composers
18th-century keyboardists
18th-century male musicians
18th-century musicians
Catholic liturgical composers
Czech Classical-period composers
Czech classical organists
Czech male classical composers
Male classical organists
Musicians from Prague